HMIS Jumna (U21) was a  sloop, which served in the Royal Indian Navy (RIN) during World War II.

After India became a republic on 26 January 1950, the vessel was renamed as the Indian Navy's INS Jamuna.

History
HMIS Jumna was ordered in 1939, and built by William Denny and Brothers. She was commissioned in 1941, and with World War II underway, was immediately deployed as a convoy escort. Jumna served as an anti-aircraft escort during the Java Sea campaign in early 1942, and was involved in intensive anti-aircraft action against attacking Japanese twin-engined level bombers and dive bombers, claiming five aircraft downed from 24–28 February 1942:
"Chief Ordnance Artificer, Peter Cajetan Mascarenhas was awarded the Distinguished Service Medal for his part in defending the convoy against the Japanese aircraft which attacked it in the Sunda Strait. The citation in the London Gazette said that he had carried out repairs to guns during dive-bombing and machine-gun attacks, and had shown great devotion to duty. Leading Seaman Khan Mohammed, who displayed skill and initiative in engaging the Japanese with an Oerlikon gun was also awarded the Distinguished Service Medal. The Gunnery Officer, Lieut. A.J.V. LeCocq, R.I.N.V.R., was decorated with the Distinguished Service Cross and six of the Jumna's ratings were mentioned in Despatches, having shown "devotion to duty during heavy and continuous dive-bombing attacks".

Ro-110 had attacked convoy JC 36 (Colombo-Calcutta) and torpedoed and damaged the British merchant Asphalion (6274 GRT).

Jumna and Narbada engaged Japanese batteries up the Kaladan River near Ponnagyun.

Following Indian independence, she was allotted to India, becoming INS Jamuna in 1950 when India became a republic. She was later converted to a survey vessel and was decommissioned on 31 December 1980.

Notes

References
 
 

Black Swan-class sloops of the Royal Indian Navy
1940 ships